Beauvois may refer to:

 Places
 Beauvois, Pas-de-Calais, France
 Beauvois-en-Cambrésis, Nord, France
 Beauvois-en-Vermandois, Aisne, France

 People
 Ambroise Marie François Joseph Palisot de Beauvois, French naturalist
 Xavier Beauvois, French actor and film director